Eugenia (minor planet designation: 45 Eugenia) is a large asteroid of the asteroid belt. It is famed as one of the first asteroids to be found to have a moon orbiting it. It was also the second triple asteroid to be discovered, after 87 Sylvia.

Discovery 
Eugenia was discovered on 27 June 1857 by the Franco-German amateur astronomer Hermann Goldschmidt. His instrument of discovery was a 4-inch aperture telescope located in his sixth floor apartment in the 6th Arrondissement of Paris. It was the forty-fifth minor planet to be discovered. The preliminary orbital elements were computed by Wilhelm Forster in Berlin, based on three observations in July, 1857.

The asteroid was named by its discoverer after Empress Eugenia di Montijo, the wife of Napoleon III. It was the first asteroid to be definitely named after a real person, rather than a figure from classical legend.

Physical characteristics 
Eugenia is a large asteroid, with a diameter of 214 km. It is an F-type asteroid, which means that it is very dark in colouring (darker than soot) with a carbonaceous composition. Like Mathilde, its density appears to be unusually low, indicating that it may be a loosely packed rubble pile, not a monolithic object. Eugenia appears to be almost anhydrous. Lightcurve analysis indicates that Eugenia's pole most likely points towards ecliptic coordinates (β, λ) = (-30°, 124°) with a 10° uncertainty, which gives it an axial tilt of 117°. Eugenia's rotation is then retrograde, rotating backward to its orbital plane.

Satellite system

Petit-Prince 

In November 1998, astronomers at the Canada-France-Hawaii Telescope on Mauna Kea, Hawaii, discovered a small moon orbiting Eugenia. This was the first time an asteroid moon had been discovered by a ground-based telescope. The moon is much smaller than Eugenia, about 13 km in diameter, and takes five days to complete an orbit around it.

The discoverers chose the name "Petit-Prince" (formally "(45) Eugenia I Petit-Prince"). This name refers to Empress Eugenia's son, the Prince Imperial. However, the discoverers also intended an allusion to the children's novella The Little Prince by Antoine de Saint-Exupéry, which is about a young prince who lives on an asteroid.

S/2004 (45) 1 
A second, smaller (estimated diameter of 6 km) satellite that orbits closer to Eugenia than Petit-Prince has since been discovered and provisionally named S/2004 (45) 1. It was discovered by analyses of three images acquired in February 2004 from the 8.2 m VLT "Yepun" at the European Southern Observatory (ESO) Cerro Paranal, in Chile. The discovery was announced in IAUC 8817, on 7 March 2007 by Franck Marchis and his IMCCE collaborators. It orbits the asteroid at about ~700 km, with an orbital period of 4.7 days.

See also 
 Dactyl and Ida, another asteroid and asteroid moon system catalogued by astronomers
 Florence, another dual-moon asteroid confirmed only in September 2017.

References

External links 
 Johnston Archive data
 Astronomical Picture of Day 14 October 1999
 SwRI Press Release
 Orbit of Petit-Prince, companion of Eugenia
 Shape model derived from lightcurve (on page 17)
 14 frames of (45) Eugenia primary taken with the Keck II AO from Dec 2003 to Nov 2011 (Franck Marchis)
 
 

000045
Discoveries by Hermann Goldschmidt
Named minor planets
45 Eugenia
45 Eugenia
000045
000045
000045
18570627